2015 Your World Awards is the four annual award hosted by Telemundo, which awarded prizes to the beauty, sports, music and telenovela. It aired on August 20, 2015, at 7pm/6c.

Winners and nominees

Telenovelas / Súper Series

Music

Variety

References 

Telemundo original programming
Premios
Premios
Premios Tu Mundo
Premios
Telemundo